Pharaoh's Island is an island in the River Thames, in Surrey, England, 270 m (300 yds) upstream of Shepperton Lock.

Overview
The island has a length of 280 m and a maximum width of 60 m.  Shepperton Lock is 270 m downstream and two other channels leading to weirs diverge off after the island to its southeast.  These channels then surround Lock Island and Hamhaugh Island.  The island is only accessible by boat, with the facilities of Lock Island downstream and moorings there or by the pub The Thames Court almost opposite its eastern tip on the nearer, north bank.

River level
Above the lock, the variation in river level has been between 0.08 m at the lock gate and 0.99 m.  This compares favourably with variation below the lock at between 2.67 m and 4.95 m in depth.

History

It was purchased by the Treasury to give to Admiral Nelson after the Battle of the Nile (1798). He used it as a fishing retreat. The island was known as Dog Ait until at least the end of the 19th century. Tory MP and High Court Judge Sir Cyril Atkinson built the first house on the island in 1903 and named it Sphinx due to his interest in Egyptology.

Residential development
Since the late 20th century it has hosted 23 homes with individual moorings. Most of the properties have Egyptian names.

The property names are, clockwise, starting in the west:

As of May 2020, Sphinx has fetched the highest cost, £1.318 million. This took place in 2013.

Deaths in January 2011
In January 2011, a small dinghy ferrying people from the island capsized with the loss of two lives. The fatalities were named as university academic Dr Rex Walford OBE, and record producer Keith Lowde.

Media representations
As the home of his family, the island was the setting for director John Boorman's two semi-autobiographical films: Hope and Glory in 1987 and Queen and Country in 2014.

Notable residents

Ian Hendry and his wife, fellow actor Janet Munro.

See also
Islands in the River Thames

References 

Islands of the River Thames
Horatio Nelson